The Espace 1000 (English: Space) is a French sailboat that was designed by Philippe Briand as a cruiser and first built in 1980.

The design was the first of the line of six Espace series boats of varying sizes that Jeanneau built in the 1980s. Its designation indicates its approximate length overall in centimeters.

Production
The design was built by Jeanneau in France, from 1980 to 1987, with 228 boats completed, but it is now out of production.

Design
The Espace 1000 is a recreational keelboat, built predominantly of fiberglass, with wood trim. It has an enclosed wheelhouse, a masthead sloop rig, with a single set of spreaders and aluminum spars with stainless steel wire rigging. The hull has a raked stem, a reverse transom, an internally mounted spade-type rudder controlled by a wheel in the cockpit and another in the wheelhouse. It has a stub keel and retractable centerboard or optional fixed fin keel. The centerboard version displaces  and carries  of ballast, while the fixed keel model displaces .

The boat is fitted with an inboard engine for docking and maneuvering.

The design has sleeping accommodation for seven people, with a double "V"-berth in the bow cabin, an "L"-shaped settee and a straight settee in the main cabin and an aft cabin with a double berth. The galley is located on the starboard side just forward of the companionway ladder. The galley is equipped with a two-burner stove, ice box and a double sink. A navigation station is opposite the galley in the wheelhouse, on the boat's centerline. The head is located just aft of the bow cabin on the port side and includes a shower.

For sailing downwind the design may be equipped with a symmetrical spinnaker.

See also
List of sailing boat types

References

External links

Video tour of an Espace 1000

Keelboats
1980s sailboat type designs
Sailing yachts
Sailboat type designs by Philippe Briand
Sailboat types built by Jeanneau